Emmerdale is a British soap opera first broadcast on 16 October 1972. The following is a list of characters that debuted during 2021, by order of first appearance. All characters are introduced by the soap's executive producer, Jane Hudson. Ethan Anderson (Emile John) is introduced in January as the son of vicar Charles Anderson (Kevin Mathurin). Frankie is then born in February. In August, Rob Jarvis joined the cast as Wendy Posner's (Susan Cookson) ex-husband Russell, later followed by Chloe Harris (Jessie Elland), the sister of Sarah Sugden's (Katie Hill) heart donor. Ben Richards then joined the cast in November as loan shark Gavin. He was followed by Carol Butler (Laura Pitt-Pulford) in December, who was introduced as the sister of one of Meena Jutla's (Paige Sandhu) victims. Additionally, multiple other characters appeared in 2021.

Ethan Anderson

Ethan Anderson, played by Emile John, made his first appearance in episode 8937, first broadcast on 7 January 2021. Ethan is introduced as the son of vicar Charles Anderson (Kevin Mathurin). Ethan's character and casting details were announced on 26 November 2020, alongside that of Charles'. Ethan was described as "intelligent", and Digital Spy noted that he "inherited his father's strong sense of justice and worked hard to carve himself a successful law career". It was also stated that Ethan would be accused and arrested of a crime he did not commit, which would lead to a rivalry between himself and the established Dingle family. Ethan works at a law firm after years of "working hard for a successful career", and John confirmed that the storyline would have "consequences" on his career.

Producer Sophie Roper stated that Emmerdale are "delighted" to be welcoming John to the soap, and noted the "dynamic new father and son duo" will "send shockwaves through the village as they find themselves embroiled in the heart of a thought-provoking story with one of our most loved families", referring to the Dingle family. She added: "With two actors of such great calibre, they're certainly set to make their mark on the Dales." Producers later confirmed that Ethan will be a heavily featured character in 2021, with the younger cast getting a focus throughout the year, and Ethan set to have a "longer-term story arc" after the conclusion of the justice storyline. John stated that playing Ethan is "a dream", and on the storyline, he stated: "I feel a tremendous sense of responsibility in articulating his struggle with truth and authenticity and I can only hope that the audience fully engage with him in the same way I have." He added that Ethan's arrival in the village would be "far from quiet", and revealed that Ethan's presence in the village will have "huge consequences" for other characters.

Ethan attends a stag party with his friends at the Woolpack, where Sarah Sugden (Katie Hill) hides a bag of drugs inside of his coat pocket, since she needs to get rid of the drugs quickly. When the police arrive at the party, they discover the drugs in his pocket, and this leads to Ethan getting arrested. He is later released on bail, but is suspended from his law firm, leading him to demand justice from Sarah. Charles advises him not to cause a rivalry between himself and the Dingle family, but feeling he has worked too hard for his career to be ruined, he continues to demand justice for himself.

Russell Posner

Russell Posner, played by Rob Jarvis, made his first appearance on 17 August 2021. Jarvis' casting was announced on 12 August 2021, with his character being described as a "mystery newcomer" set to be involved in a storyline for Wendy Posner (Susan Cookson); his connection to Wendy was not initially revealed. His initial scenes see him approach Ben Tucker (Simon Lennon) for information on Wendy and he confirms that he will be sticking around in the village to see her. Russell was later confirmed to be Wendy's abusive ex-husband. He confronts Wendy about his dead mother leaving Harry Sugden (Brody and Teddy Hall) money in her will rather than him. He tells Wendy that if she does not help him to get the inheritance from Harry, her and Harry's mother Victoria Sugden (Isabel Hodgins) will "face consequences".

On 31 August 2021, it was confirmed that Russell would hold Wendy and Victoria hostage in a siege at the Hide café to get his money. Speaking about the plot, Jarvis said that Russell tells Wendy that he has been involved in an armed robbery and that the police are after him. Jarvis opined that Russell does not want to shoot anyone, but sees a siege as a last resort to getting the money he needs. The actor also felt that Russell would be capable of shooting someone due to the desperation of his situation. Despite the state of their relationship, Jarvis stated that his character likely still has feelings for Wendy, due to the pair sharing children together. Following the police being called to the siege, Russell is imprisoned and Jarvis made his final appearance on 16 September 2021.

Chloe Harris

Chloe Harris, played by Jessie Elland, made her first appearance on 20 August 2021. Chloe was introduced as the sister of Gemma Harris, a dead teenager whose heart was given to Sarah Sugden (Katie Hill) in a transplant. Elland was attracted to the role as she felt that Chloe is a well-written character and she felt a responsibility to do the role justice when she was cast. Chloe is characterised as a sweet and genuine person who is secretly struggling with feelings of sadness, anger, and frustration. This is initially explained through her grief for her dead sister, but later into her tenure, it is revealed that she has a controlling father who is in prison. Chloe's family home is installed with several cameras and her father hires numerous people to watch over her. Eventually, Kerry Wyatt (Laura Norton), her housekeeper, helps her to escape and invites her to live with Kerry in Emmerdale village. Elland has since hinted that her father could be cast on the series at some point in the future.

When Chloe moves into the village, she forms a relationship with Noah Dingle (Jack Downham). She eventually loses interest in him and has casual relationships with Jacob Gallagher (Joe-Warren Plant) and Nate Robinson (Jurell Carter). This led to the introduction of a stalking storyline for Chloe, when Noah forms an unhealthy and sexist obsession with Chloe. The storyline saw him tracking her location, letting himself into her room, photographing her and her belongings and eventually holding her hostage when she learns of his obsession. Elland praised Emmerdale for covering a storyline about misogyny and sexism, a topic she described as "such a relevant conversation, especially in this day and age". She also felt privileged to be given an important topical storyline. Viewers did not initially trust Chloe and were unsure of her intentions with Sarah, but as her tenure progressed, they have warmed to her.

Gavin

Gavin, played by Ben Richards, made his first appearance on 25 November 2021. Richards confirmed his casting on 7 October 2021 via Twitter, where he wrote that he was "chuffed" to be appearing on Emmerdale. It was later confirmed that Gavin would act as a villain on the soap and would be a business partner of Al Chapman (Michael Wildman). Richards was doing a gig on a ship when he learned of his audition for the role of Gavin and filmed his self-tape audition in a cabin. When he read the brief for the role, he felt that he knew exactly how to portray Gavin and felt that he was well written. He was also attracted to the role as he finds it "so much fun to play a baddie" since he felt that they are more interesting than nice characters. Digital Spy confirmed that Gavin was a recurring character and asked Richards if he would take on a regular role on the soap, to which he replied that if viewers want more Gavin, he would be happy to portray him for a longer tenure.

On his character, Richards said that Gavin has a lot of danger about him but is not brutal. He explained that Gavin is "clever and cultured – he's a modern-day gangster and doesn't get his own hands dirty if he wants something doing". When asked about his character's backstory, Richards said that Gavin grew up on a council estate in poverty but began a loan shark business through charging high interest rates. He said that Gavin has a number of customers who cannot lend money from a bank and hinted that people who do not pay him back end up in hospital. Richards said that when Al and Gavin interact, Al becomes "out of his depth" due to Gavin and his investors being very serious; he also hinted that Al and his relatives are in danger with Gavin. He also revealed that he had been filming with Jeff Hordley and opined that Gavin is a match for his character, Cain Dingle. He added that their scenes together are "explosive and really exciting to play".

Carol Butler

Carol Butler, played by Laura Pitt-Pulford, made her first appearance on 24 December 2021. Pitt-Pulford's casting was confirmed on 13 December 2021. Carol was introduced as the sister of Nadine Butler, who was murdered by Meena Jutla (Paige Sandhu) several years prior to her arrival in the village.

Carol meets with Meena's sister, Manpreet Sharma (Rebecca Sarker), and tells her what Meena did to Nadine, which involved manipulating and isolating Nadine from her family and friends, leading to Meena murdering her. She warns Manpreet that Meena is dangerous. She later attends Meena's trial once she is arrested, but walks out after an outburst regarding the court not prosecuting Meena for Nadine's murder due to lack of evidence. Carol ends up smashing a mirror in a fit of rage, injuring her hand. When Meena is found guilty for her crimes, she throws a huge tantrum and Carol angrily confronts her in the courtroom. Meena mocks Nadine and says that Nadine was so irrelevant that she was not even charged for her death. Carol then furiously stabs Meena with a piece of glass from the broken mirror, but she survives, and Carol is arrested.

Other characters

Notes

References

External links
 Characters and cast at itv.com
 Characters and cast at IMDb

Emmerdale
2021
, Emmerdale